Uros Vasic (born 25 October 2001) is a Swiss footballer who plays as a left winger for Thun. He is of Serbian descent.

Club career
Vasic was born in Brig-Glis and started playing football at Naters before joining Thun. He moved through the youth teams of Thun before debuting for their U21 squad in the 1. Liga, the fourth tier of the Swiss football league system, on 1 September 2018. On 25 May 2019, he was named in the first-team matchday squad for the first time, but did not receive playing time. Prior to the 2019–20 season, he signed a professional contract with Thun and was promoted to a permanent member of the first-team squad at the age of 18. He debuted in the Swiss Super League on 28 July 2019 in a 0–0 draw against Lugano. At the end of the 2019–20 season, Thun was relegated to the Swiss Challenge League after losing in the relegation play-offs against FC Vaduz.

On 4 January 2022, Vasic was loaned to Naters until the end of the 2021–22 season.

International career
Born in Switzerland, Vasic is of Serbian descent. Between 2017 and 2019, Vasic has represented Switzerland at the under-17, under-18, and under-19 level. He was part of the Swiss squad at the 2018 UEFA European Under-17 Championship and appeared in two group stage matches as a substitute. Switzerland placed third in their group and did not move on to the knockout phase of the tournament.

References

External links

2001 births
Swiss men's footballers
Switzerland youth international footballers
Swiss people of Serbian descent
Living people
Association football midfielders
FC Thun players
FC Naters players
Swiss Super League players
Swiss Challenge League players
Swiss 1. Liga (football) players
2. Liga Interregional players